Billy Dixon (born 12 February 1941) is an Irish former association footballer who played as a forward.

He began his career at Home Farm F.C. and after playing for Waterford United F.C. he signed for Drumcondra F.C. where he made his debut in a 5-5 draw with Shamrock Rovers in 1963. He scored in Inter-Cities Fairs Cup wins over Danish side B 1909 of Odense (twice) and Bayern Munich.

He joined Shamrock Rovers F.C. in June 1966 and scored on his debut.

He earned one League of Ireland XI while at Milltown and 12 in total and scored 4 goals in 10 appearances in the UEFA Cup Winners' Cup.

Dixon scored the winner in his only FAI Cup final in 1967.

He scored twice while playing for Rovers when they represented Boston as Boston Rovers in the summer of 1967 United Soccer Association.

He was placed on the transfer list in July 1971 after five years at Glenmalure Park.

Dixon signed for Drogheda United F.C. soon after with Joe Haverty and scored on his debut against Rovers. Over his career he accumulated 6 goals in 12 European cup games.

Honours
League of Ireland: 1
  Drumcondra F.C. - 1964/65
FAI Cup: 1
  Shamrock Rovers - 1967
League of Ireland Shield: 1
  Shamrock Rovers - 1967/68
Leinster Senior Cup: 1
  Shamrock Rovers - 1969
Dublin City Cup: 1
  Shamrock Rovers - 1966/67
Top Four Cup: 3
  Drumcondra F.C. - 1962/63, 1964/65
  Shamrock Rovers - 1965/66

Sources

Citations

Bibliography
 The Hoops by Paul Doolan and Robert Goggins

Republic of Ireland association footballers
Home Farm F.C. players
Waterford F.C. players
Drumcondra F.C. players
Shamrock Rovers F.C. players
Drogheda United F.C. players
League of Ireland players
United Soccer Association players
Boston Rovers players
Living people
1941 births
League of Ireland XI players
Dublin University A.F.C. coaches
Association football midfielders
Republic of Ireland football managers
Association football coaches